Bikini Drive-In is a 1995 American film.

Plot
A girl inherits a drive-in movie theatre.

Cast
 Ashlie Rhey as Kim Taylor
 Richard Gabai as Brian Winston
 Ross Hagen as Harry
 Peter Spellos as Carl (as G. Gordon Bear)
 Roxanne Blaze as Carrie (as Sarah Bellomo)
 Rob Vogl as Bobby
 Steve Barkett as Sheriff Bloodstone
 Nikki Fritz as Susan
 Tom Shell as Tom
 George Cost as Daryl
 Michelle Bauer as Dyanne Lynn
 David F. Friedman as J.B. Winston
 Conrad Brooks as Oscar
 Gordon Mitchell as Goliath
 Hoke Howell as Attorney
 Fred Olen Ray as Randy Rocket (as Randy Rocket)
 Becky LeBeau as Candy (as Sharona Bonner)
 Tane McClure as Mandy

External links

Bikini Drive-In at Letterboxd

Films directed by Fred Olen Ray
1995 films
American sex comedy films
Teen sex comedy films
1995 comedy films
1990s English-language films
1990s American films